In 1923–24, battlecruisers ,  and the Special Service Squadron sailed around the world on The Empire Cruise, making many ports of call in the countries which had fought together during the First World War. The squadron departed Devonport on 27 November 1923 and headed for Sierra Leone. Returning from the Pacific, the battlecruisers passed through the Panama Canal, while the light cruisers rounded Cape Horn.

Ships involved

Battlecruisers under Rear Admiral Sir Frederick Field -
  (Captain John K Im Thurn)
 HMS Repulse (Captain Henry Parker)
Light cruisers under Rear Admiral Sir Hubert Brand
 HMS Danae (Captain F Austin)
 HMS Dauntless (Captain C Round-Turner)
 HMS Delhi (Captain J Pipon)
 HMS Dragon (Captain B Fairbairn)
 HMS Dunedin (Captain AF Beal)
 HMAS Adelaide Joined in Australia.

Ports of call

Africa and the Indian Ocean
The fleet sailed from HMNB Devonport on 27 November 1923, and headed for Freetown, Sierra Leone. Whereupon the fleet was greeted by the Governor of Sierra Leone. Food and provisions were taken aboard after the journey of 2805 miles. The ships then sailed to Cape Town and arrived 22 December, adding a further 3,252 miles to the cruise distance. Some of the sailors and marines performed in a ceremonial march, to great fanfare.

The fleet sailed for a short visit to Mossel Bay, East London and Durban, where the fleet left South Africa on 6 January 1924 for Zanzibar. Upon port arrival in Zanzibar on 17 January the fleet was greeted by Sultan Khalifa Bin Harub, which now encompassed the regular ceremonial March Past. The total distance covered was 11,734 miles.

 Cape Verde
 Sierra Leone
 Cape Town
 Durban
 Zanzibar
 Mombasa
 Dar-es-Salaam (Danae)
 Trincomalee

Far East
The fleet arrived for the far east tour in Port Swettenham, Malaysia, on 4 February, where the ship fired a 17 gun salute for the Sultan. The fleet also incurred its first fatality when a seaman died of malaria, a local funeral was arranged. 10 February marked the arrival of the fleet at the important British Naval Base at Singapore. In the same year of the cruise Singapore had been approved by the British Government to become the major British base in the far east with massive investment.

 Port Swettenham, Malaysia 
 Singapore

Australia and New Zealand
 Fremantle
 Albany, Western Australia
 Adelaide
 Melbourne
 Hobart
 Jervis Bay
 Sydney (Adelaide joins)
 Brisbane, Wellington
 Sydney (2)
 Lyttleton
 Bluff (one ship)
 Dunedin
 Auckland

Pacific
 Fiji
 Honolulu

West coast of North America and Caribbean
 Vancouver
 Esquimalt/Victoria
 San Francisco
 Colón, Panama
 Jamaica

South America
 Callao
 Valparaiso (Delhi, Danae)
 Talcahuano (Dauntless, Dragon)
 Punta Arenas (if necessary)
 Falkland Islands (if weather suits)
 Bahía Blanca (Dragon)
 Buenos Aires (Delhi, Danae)
 Montevideo (Dauntless, Dragon)
 Rio de Janeiro

East coast of Canada and Newfoundland
 Halifax, Nova Scotia
 Quebec City
 Conception Bay, Newfoundland

See also
 List of circumnavigations

References

External links

 Australian Itinerary from HMS Repulse
 HMS Hood Empire Cruise
 Photo album from Empire Cruise
 Youtube: "World Cruise" of the Special Service Squadron
 Comprehensive website including scans of the official cruise book

20th-century history of the Royal Navy
1920s in military history